Vasile Ianul (1 November 1945 – 20 March 2013) was a Romanian footballer who played as a defender. He died on 20 March 2013.

Career
Vasile Ianul played as a defender for Politehnica Iași from 1966 until 1974, a period in which he helped the club win two promotions in the first league. After he ended his playing career, Ianul worked as a lawyer and in 1975 he became a football referee, managing to arbitrate matches in the Romanian top-division Divizia A. From 1981 until 1985 he was Politehnica Iași's president a period in which the club managed to win a promotion to the first league in the 1981–82 season, also being the club's coach for a short period in 1983. In 1985 he became the head of Dinamo București's football section, in 1991 he was named the club's vice-president and from 1992 until 1994, Ianul was president. During this period of nine years spent at Dinamo, the club won two league titles, two cups and reached the European Cup Winners' Cup semi-finals in the 1989–1990 edition. In 1998 Ianul was charged with fraudulent management of Dinamo's funds, remanded in custody twice, first between November 20-30, 1998, and the second time between May 12, 1999 and January 11, 2002, he was sentenced to 12 years in prison. Later, however, the punishment was annulled, because the prescription intervened in the case of the transfers of footballers Dorinel Munteanu, Ioan Sabău and Bogdan Stelea.

International career
Vasile Ianul played one game at international level for Romania, being used by coach Gheorghe Ola in a 1972 friendly, played on Stade d'Honneur from Casablanca, which ended with a 4–2 victory against Morocco.

Honours

Player
Politehnica Iași
Divizia B: 1967–68, 1972–73

References

External links
Vasile Ianul player profile at Labtof.ro
Vasile Ianul manager profile at Labtof.ro
Vasile Ianul referee profile at Labtof.ro

1945 births
2013 deaths
Romanian footballers
Romania international footballers
Association football defenders
Liga I players
Liga II players
FC Politehnica Iași (1945) players
FC Universitatea Cluj players
Romanian football managers
Romanian football referees
Romanian sports executives and administrators
20th-century Romanian lawyers